A Dozen Furies was a metalcore band from Dallas, Texas. They were the winners of the 2004 MTV reality show Battle for Ozzfest.  They were awarded a spot on the 10th anniversary of Ozzfest as well as a record deal with Sanctuary Records. They released one studio album, A Concept from Fire, on September 13, 2005, before disbanding in 2006. Members have gone in different directions while still remaining friends.

Band members
Bucky Garrett – vocals
Marc Serrano - guitar
Joey Turner - guitar
Keith Reber - bass
Mike Miller - drums

Discography
2004: Rip the Stars Down (EP)
2005: A Concept from Fire

External links
Myspace page
A Dozen Furies interview
A Dozen Furies at Sanctuary Records

Metalcore musical groups from Texas
Musical groups from Dallas
Heavy metal musical groups from Texas
Musical groups established in 2004
Musical groups disestablished in 2006